The Dictionary of the Scots Language (DSL) is an online Scots-English dictionary, now run by Dictionaries of the Scots Language, formerly known as Scottish Language Dictionaries, a registered SCIO charity. Freely available via the Internet, the work comprises the two major dictionaries of the Scots language:
Dictionary of the Older Scottish Tongue (DOST), 12 volumes
Scottish National Dictionary (SND), 10 volumes
The DOST contains information about Older Scots words in use from the 12th to the end of the 17th centuries (Early and Middle Scots); SND contains information about Scots words in use from 1700 to the 1970s (Modern Scots). Together these 22 volumes provide a comprehensive history of Scots. The SND Bibliography and the DOST Register of Titles have also been digitised and can be searched in the same way as the main data files. A new supplement compiled by Scottish Language Dictionaries was added in 2005.

The digitisation project, which ran from February 2001 to January 2004, was based at the University of Dundee and primarily funded by a grant from the Arts and Humanities Research Board, with additional support provided by the Scottish National Dictionary Association and the Russell Trust. The project team was led by academic, Dr Victor Skretkowicz and lexicographer, Susan Rennie, a former Senior Editor with the Scottish National Dictionary Association. Its methodology was based on a previous, pilot project by Rennie to digitise the Scottish National Dictionary (the eSND project), using a customised XML markup based on Text Encoding Initiative guidelines. The Dictionary of the Scots Language data was later used to create sample categories for a new Historical Thesaurus of Scots project, led by Rennie at the University of Glasgow, which was launched in 2015.

Dr Victor Skretkowicz was born in Hamilton, Ontario, in 1942; joined the University of Dundee's English Department in 1978 and in 1989, became the Dundee University's representative on the Joint Council for the Dictionary of the Older Scottish Tongue being elected as its convenor three years later. Under his direction it was responsible for volumes 9-12 of that dictionary. In 2001, he was appointed Research Director of the project to create the Dictionary of the Scots Language. Skretkowicz retired from Dundee in 2007 and died in 2009. Archives relating to his work are held by the University of Dundee's Archive Services.

References

External links
 
ScotLex page on the Dictionary of the Scots Language
ScotLex page on the Historical Thesaurus of Scots (based on the DSL)
(PDF file) Inventory of the Scottish National Dictionary Association at the National Library of Scotland

Internet properties established in 2001
Scots Language
 
Scottish non-fiction books
University of Dundee